is a Japanese professional footballer who plays as a centre-back for Bundesliga club Schalke 04 and captains the Japan national team.

Club career

Nagoya Grampus
Born in Nagasaki, Japan, Yoshida began playing football at Nanling FC in his second year at elementary school. His older brother, Honami, played an important role in starting his football career when he searched on the internet for Nagoya Grampus's U-15 team and this led Yoshida to join the U-15 side. Once Yoshida has joined, Yoshida relocated to Nagoya to be close at Nagoya Grampus and attended Toyota High School.

After spending five years at Nagoya Grampus Youth Academy, he was promoted to the first team in the 2007 season, having signed his first professional contract. Yoshida joined the club's first team training soon after and started out in a defensive midfielder when playing for Grampus's youth team, but was converted to a centre back. After spending months on the substitute bench, Yoshida finally made his debut for the club, coming on as a second-half substitute, in a 2–1 loss against Oita Trinita on 3 May 2007. Since then, he became a first team regular for the side, playing in the centre–back position. It wasn't until on 5 November 2007 when Yoshida scored his first Nagoya Grampus goal, in a 3–1 win against Thespa Kusatsu in the fourth round of the Emperor's Cup. At the end of the 2007 season, he went on to make twenty–four appearances and scoring once in all competitions.

In the 2008 season, Yoshida began to feature in the starting line-up for most of the league matches with his Serbian teammate Miloš Bajalica. He started the season well when he helped the side go on an unbeaten with seven matches in all competitions. Yoshida continued to feature in the first team until he was called up to the Japan U23 squad in July. After Japan U23's elimination in the Summer Olympics, it wasn't until on 23 August 2008 when Yoshida returned to the starting line-up against Kashima Antlers and scored his first goal of the season, in a 2–1 win. Following this, he lost his first team place and was placed on the substitute bench for the next five matches, leading his playing time to be reduced. Yoshida's second goal then came on 2 November 2008 against FC Gifu in the fourth round of the Emperor's Cup and helped them win 1–0. By mid–October, he regained his first team place for the remaining matches of the season and helped the side finish third place in the league. For his performance, Yoshida was award Rookie of the Year at the 14th Aichi Toyota "Grand Pass Rankle Award". At the end of the 2008 season, he went on to make twenty–nine appearances and scoring two times in all competitions.

At the start of the 2009 season, Yoshida switched number shirt to four. He scored Nagoya Grampus's historical first goal in the AFC Champions League in the game against Ulsan Hyundai Horang-i on 10 March 2009. Yoshida continued to regain his first team place for the side, playing in the centre–back position. A month later on 26 April 2009, he scored his second goal of the season, in a 2–1 win against Yokohama F. Marinos. However, Yoshida suffered a calf injury that saw him sidelined for two weeks. Yoshida made his first team return on 18 July 2009 and started the whole game, in a 1–1 draw against Kyoto Sanga. He scored his third goal of the season, in a 2–1 win against FC Tokyo eleven days later on 29 July 2009, but the club was eliminated in the J.League Cup following a 6–3 on aggregate. Yoshida later added two more goals throughout September, scoring against Kashiwa Reysol and Kawasaki Frontale. Since returning to the first team, Yoshida regained his first team place for the remaining matches of the season. He later added two more goals throughout October. Yoshida scored his eighth goal of the season, in a 3–1 win against Júbilo Iwata in the fourth round of the Emperor's Cup. He later helped the club to reach the Emperor's Cup final after beating Shimizu S-Pulse 5–4 on penalty shoot–out following a 1–1 draw throughout 120 minutes. However, he started in the Emperor's Cup Final against Gamba Osaka, as Nagoya Grampus lost 4–1 in what turned out to be his last appearance for the club. At the end of the 2009 season, Yoshida went on to make forty–eight appearances and scoring eight times in all competitions.

VVV-Venlo

In December 2009, it was announced that Yoshida had transferred to Dutch club VVV-Venlo, signing a three–year contract. He had desired to play for a club in Europe since he was young. Keisuke Honda, who was his teammate at Nagoya Grampus, introduced his agent, Tetsuro Kiyooka to support his future vision. Indeed, Yoshida followed the footsteps of Keisuke Honda who also played for VVV-Venlo before he joined them. However, Yoshida's start to VVV-Venlo career suffered a setback when he fractured his foot and left him sidelined for the rest of the 2009–10 season.

At the start of the 2010–11 season, Yoshida continued to recover from his fractured foot. It wasn't until on 30 October 2010 when he made his VVV-Venlo debut, coming on as a 75th-minute substitute, and set up the club's third goal of the game, in a 5–3 loss against FC Groningen. Since making his debut, Yoshida quickly became a first team regular for the side. After spending January with Japan in the Asian Cup and winning the tournament, he made his first team return, starting the whole game, in a 3–0 win against NAC Breda on 5 February 2011. Yoshida later regained his first team place for the remaining matches of the season, as VVV-Venlo qualified for the relegation play–offs. He started all the four matches in the relegation play–offs and helped the club retain their Eredivisie league status. At the end of the 2010–11 season, Yoshida went on to make twenty–four appearances in all competitions.

At the start of the 2011–12 season, Yoshida continued to retain his first team place for the side, playing in the centre–back position. He scored a bicycle kick goal for VVV-Venlo off a corner kick on 11 September 2011 against PSV Eindhoven, as the match ended in a 3–3 draw. This goal was awarded as "Goal of the Season 2011–2012" of the Eredivisie. The Yoshida scored his second goal of the season, in a 4–1 win against RKC Waalwijk on 22 October 2011. It wasn't until on 18 February 2012 when he scored his third goal of the season, in a 4–1 win against De Graafschap. Yoshida's fourth goal of the season came on 3 March 2012, in a 2–1 win against NAC Breda. He scored his fifth goal of the season against Roda JC, but was sent off in the 73rd minute for an unprofessional foul, in a 3–1 loss. After serving a two match suspension, Yoshida returned to the starting line-up, starting the whole game, in a 2–0 loss against PSV Eindhoven on 31 March 2012. He later started all the four matches in the relegation play–offs and helped the club retain their Eredivisie league status once again. Yoshida's experience in the relegation play–offs led him to write a blog about the subject. At the end of the 2011–12 season, Yoshida went on to make thirty–seven appearances and scoring five times in all competitions as a central defender.

In the 2012–13 season, Yoshida made two appearances for the side, including one against ADO Den Haag on 25 August 2012, in which he set up the club's first goal of the game, as they lost 4–2 in what turned out to be his last appearance for VVV-Venlo.

Southampton

On 30 August 2012, Yoshida agreed to join newly–promoted Premier League side Southampton on a three-year contract for a fee thought to be in the region of £3 million and was joined by his teammate, Tadanari Lee. Upon joining the club, he told the Southern Daily Echo that the move to England would help him grow as a player.

Yoshida made his debut for the Saints on 15 September 2012, against Arsenal in a 6–1 defeat, coming on as a 28th-minute substitute for Jos Hooiveld. He then made his home debut a week later on 22 September 2012 in a 4–1 win over Aston Villa, playing the whole 90 minutes. Since joining the club, Yoshida quickly became a first team regular, playing in the centre–back position and forming a partnership with José Fonte. During a 1–1 draw against Swansea City on 10 November 2012, Yoshida made a poor control to the ball that led to Nathan Dyer scoring an equaliser. Despite, he continued to retain his first team place against Queens Park Rangers and helped them win 3–1 on 15 November 2012. Along the way, he was rotated to playing in the left–back and right–back positions. Since making his debut for Southampton, Yoshida started in every match for the side and helped improve the results on both the club and the player, himself. Having started the 2012–13 season at the bottom of the table, results have improved and he helped the side avoid relegation by finishing fourteenth place. In his first season at Southampton, he went on to make thirty–four appearances in all competitions.

However at the start of the 2013–14 season, Yoshida's first team opportunities became limited under the management of Mauricio Pochettino and he found himself on the substitute bench. Despite this, he made his first appearance of the season, in a 5–1 win against Barnsley on 27 August 2013. Yoshida then scored his first goal for Southampton in a 2–1 defeat to Sunderland in the League Cup on 6 November 2013. A month later on 4 December 2013, he made his first Premier League appearance, starting the whole game, in a 3–2 loss against Aston Villa. At the start of January, Yoshida had a first team run in following an injury to Dejan Lovren, starting the next six matches and improved with the results. He scored his first Premier League goal in a 3–1 defeat at West Ham United on 22 February 2014 after a Steven Davis free kick. But following Lovern's return, he was once again behind the pecking order in the centre–back competitions, as well as, his own injury concerns. At the end of the 2013–14 season, Yoshida went on to make fourteen appearances and scoring two times in all competitions.

At the start of the 2014–15 season, Yoshida regained his first team place, playing in the centre–back position, following Lovern's departure. However, during a 1–0 win against Swansea City on 20 September 2014, he suffered ankle injury that saw him substituted in the second half, resulting in him sidelined for four weeks. Although Yoshida returned from injury, he was placed on the substitute bench until on 30 November 2014 against Manchester City, coming on as a second–half substitute, in a 3–0 loss. His next goal came on 20 December 2014, in a 3–0 victory over Everton, with Steven Davis again providing the assist. Two weeks later on 8 January 2015, Southampton announced that Yoshida and the club had agreed terms to an extension of his contract until 2018. After spending January with Japan's campaign at the AFC Asian Cup, he returned to the starting line-up and played the whole game, in a 1–0 loss against Swansea City on 1 February 2015. In a follow–up match against Queens Park Rangers, Yoshida played an important role in the game when he set up the only goal of the game, in a 1–0 win. Towards the end of the season, he found himself in and out of the starting line-up in the first team and demoted on the substitute bench. Despite this, Yoshida helped the club finish seventh place in the league, resulting in their qualifying for the UEFA Europa League next season. At the end of the 2014–15 season, he went on to make twenty–three appearances and scoring once in all competitions.

At the start of the 2015–16 season, Yoshida started the season well when he helped a clean sheet in both legs by beating Vitesse 5–0 on aggregate in the third round of the UEFA Europa League. However, Yoshida was unable to help Southampton reach the Group Stage of the tournament after losing 2–1 on aggregate against Midtjylland. Despite this, Yoshida helped the club keep three consecutive clean sheets between 23 August 2015 and 23 September 2015. Having started playing in the centre–back position, he played in the right–back position, due to increase competitions among the centre–backs. During a match against Manchester United on 21 September 2015, Yoshida was at fault when his back pass backfired, allowing Anthony Martial to score, as Southampton lost 3–2. Following this, Yoshida mostly appeared for the side from the substitute bench, due to strong competitions in the defence. On 28 October 2015, he scored his first goal of the 2015–16 season with a 20-yard strike against Aston Villa in the League Cup. Yoshida's second goal of the season came on 6 February 2016 in a 1–0 victory at St. Mary's over West Ham United. The club later finished sixth place in the league, resulting their qualification of the UEFA Europa League once again next season. At the end of the 2015–16 season, he went on to make twenty–seven appearances and scoring two times in all competitions.

At the start of the 2016–17 season, Yoshida started the match against Watford in the opening game of the season, resulting a 1–1 draw. However, he became a backup in the club's centre–back position behind Virgil van Dijk and Fonte. Despite this, national newspaper Daily Mirror mentioned Yoshida in their article of Premier League pace-setters. It wasn't until on 6 November 2016 when he made his return to the starting line-up against Hull City and won a penalty, leading Charlie Austin to successfully convert, leading Southampton losing 2–1. Amid to the league, Yoshida started all six matches in the UEFA Europa League. He helped the side keep two clean sheets in the first two matches. After a famous 2–1 win against Inter Milan on 3 November 2016, their forms declined and were eliminated from the tournament. It wasn't until on 7 January 2017 when Yoshida scored his first goal of the season, in a 2–2 draw against Norwich City in the third round of the EFL Cup. Following the match, he dedicated his goal to his newly born baby daughter. Yoshida captained the side for the first time in his Southampton's career, beating Norwich City 1–0 in the third round of the FA Cup replay. Despite indifferent form on the part of both Yoshida and Southampton as a whole, Southampton became the first team in history to reach the final without conceding a single goal after beating Liverpool 2–0 on aggregate in the EFL semi–finals. Yoshida previously helped Southampton keep three clean sheets in a built up to the EFL Cup semi–finals. However, he started in the final, as Southampton lost 3–2 to Manchester United on 26 February 2017. Following Fonte's departure from the club, Yoshida regained his first team place for the rest of the season. It wasn't until on 5 April 2017 when he scored his second goal of the season, in a 3–1 win against Crystal Palace. After the match, Manager Claude Puel praised Yoshida's performance, saying he was "fantastic" and mentioned that he could be "a captain" for Southampton. In a follow–up, Yoshida captained the side once again, in a 1–0 win against West Bromwich Albion. He then made his 100th appearance for Southampton and Premier League overall, becoming the first Japanese player to reach the milestone, in a 0–0 draw against Hull City on 29 April 2017. At the end of the 2016–17 season, which saw the club finish in seventh place, Yoshida went on to make thirty–seven appearances and scoring two times in all competitions.

In the 2017–18 season, Yoshida appeared in the first three league matches of the season, including winning a penalty and it was successfully converted by Austin, in a 3–2 win against West Ham United on 19 August 2017. It was announced on 24 August 2017 that Yoshida signed a further extension of his contract with Southampton until 2020. He continued to remain in competitions among the centre–backs, which saw him placed on the substitute bench. It wasn't until on 30 September 2017 when Yoshida scored his first goal of the season, scoring from a volley in the 75th minute in a 2–1 loss against Stoke City. By the end of 2017, he captained six out of the eight matches for the side. Yoshida also scored his second goal of the season, in a 4–1 loss against Leicester City on 13 December 2017. However, Yoshida suffered a hamstring injury that kept him out for two weeks. It wasn't until on 27 January 2018 when he made return from injury, coming on as a 67th-minute substitute, in a 1–0 win against Watford. Yoshida's return was short–lived when he suffered a knee injury that kept him out for two months. It wasn't until on 8 April 2018 when Yoshida returned to the starting line-up and played for 72 minutes before being substituted, in a 3–2 loss against Arsenal. Throughout the 2017–18 season, the club have found themselves in a relegation zone, putting their Premier League status under threat. However, in the penultimate match of the season, a 1–1 draw with Everton on 5 May 2018, he was sent–off for a second bookable offence, so was suspended for the visit to Swansea City from which Southampton needed a win to survive at their hosts' expense. The match was won by Southampton, so Swansea City were relegated. At the end of the 2017–18 season, Yoshida went on to make twenty–eight appearances and scoring two times in all competitions.

Ahead of the 2018–19 season, Yoshida was linked a move away from Southampton, with Saudi Arabian side Al Hilal interested. But the transfer speculation came to an end after Yoshida announced his intention to stay at the club. At the start of the season, he found his first team opportunities limited under the management of Mark Hughes. It wasn't until on 27 August 2018 when Yoshida made his first appearance of the season, starting the whole game, in a 1–0 win against Brighton & Hove Albion in the second round of the EFL Cup. He soon had a first team run, starting a lot of matches by the end of 2018. Following his international commitment with Japan at the AFC Asian Cup came to an end, it wasn't until on 27 February 2019 when Yoshida returned to the starting line-up and helped the side keep a clean sheet, in a 2–0 win against Fulham. Since returning to the first team, he regained his place for the rest of the season and helped Southampton avoid relegation once again. Despite being sidelined with an illness that eventually saw him out for the rest of the 2018–19 season, Yoshida went on to make twenty appearances in all competitions.

In the 2019–20 season, Yoshida made his first appearance of the season, starting the whole game, in a 2–1 loss against Liverpool on 17 August 2019. He soon had a first team run ins for the next two months. Following a 9–0 loss to Leicester City in October, Yoshida was dropped to the bench and only played two further times for the team. On 30 June 2020, he confirmed his departure from the club after 8 years.

Sampdoria
On 31 January 2020, Yoshida joined Serie A side Sampdoria on loan until the end of the season. Local newspaper the Southern Daily Echo described Yoshida's departure as the "end of an era".

Having appeared on the substitute bench for two matches, Yoshida made his Sampdoria debut against Hellas Verona on 8 March 2020 and played the whole game, as the club won 2–1. Following his debut for Sampdoria, he quickly became a fan favourite among the club's supporters. However, this turns out to be his only appearance for Sampdoria, as the season was suspended because of the COVID-19 pandemic. He remained an integral part of the club once the season resumed behind closed doors. In a match against Udinese on 12 July 2020, Yoshida set up a goal for Manolo Gabbiadini to help Sampdoria secure a 3–1 win. By the end of the 2019–20 season, Yoshida made fourteen appearances in all competitions.

After two months of negotiations over a permanent move, Yoshida returned to Sampdoria, signing a one–year contract with the club and took a pay cut upon doing so. His first game after signing for Sampdoria on a permanent basis came in the opening game of the season against Juventus, coming on as a second half substititute, in a 3–0 loss. Since joining the club, he found himself facing competitions in the centre–back positions with Omar Colley and Lorenzo Tonelli. Despite this, Yoshida continued to remain in the starting line–up, forming a centre–back partnership with either Colley or Tonelli. Halfway through the 2020–21 season, Yoshida played in the right–back position three times between 23 December 2020 and 6 January 2021, due to the absent of Bartosz Bereszyński. Following the return of Bereszyński, he returned to playing in the centre–back position for the rest of the 2020–21 season. On 19 January 2021, Yoshida signed a two–year contract with the club, keeping him until 2022. He  scored his first goal for the Blucerchiati on 24 January 2021 against Parma. Despite suffering setbacks on two occasions throughout the 2020–21 season, Yoshida made thirty–four appearances and scoring once in all competitions.

Schalke 04
On 5 July 2022, he was unveiled as a new Schalke 04 player, signing a one-year contract extending until 30 June, with a renewal option in his contract.

International career

Youth career

Yoshida earned a call-up for Japan's U-23 team in April 2008 for the first time following good performance at Nagoya Grampus. A month later on 22 May 2008, he made his Japan U23 debut in the Toulon Tournament and started the whole game, in a 2–1 win against France. Yoshida went on to make two appearances in the tournament, as Japan U-23 finished fourth place after reaching the semi–finals.

It was announced on 14 July 2008 that Yoshida was called up to the Japan U-23 team for the 2008 Summer Olympic in Beijing. After appearing twice as an unused substitute, he made his debut in the tournament, starting the whole game, in a 1–0 loss against Netherlands on 13 August 2008 and the side was eliminated from the tournament. Four years later, Yoshida was called up to the Japan U-23 team for the second time ahead of the 2012 Summer Olympics in London. Ahead of the tournament, he was named as captain by Manager Takashi Sekizuka. Yoshida's first match as captain came on 26 July 2012 against Spain and helped the side keep a clean sheet, in a 1–0 win. In the next two matches, he helped the side keep two more clean sheets against Morocco U23 and Honduras U23 with a win and draw respectively, resulting in Japan U23 qualifying for the knockout stage. Yoshida scored his first goal of the tournament, scoring a header from Hiroshi Kiyotake's free kick, in a 3–0 against Egypt U23 in the quarter–finals. However, he continued to lead Japan U23 finished fourth place in the Olympics after losing to Mexico U23 and South Korea U23. After the match, Yoshida said: "I can appreciate that the team whose initial expectation was not so high has advanced to the top four for the first time in 44 years. I do not think why I could not go on it or got a medal The Olympics are a gathering of young athletes called the U-23, and it is important that as many athletes go into the national team as A and stand on the World Cup stage."

In June 2021, Yoshida was named in the squad for his third Olympic tournament, this time on home soil, as one of three available over-age players. It was also announced that he would be the captain for the tournament. Prior to the start of the Olympics, Yoshida was featured in three out of the four friendly matches for the Samurai Blue. During which, he said about the Olympics event without spectators, saying: "I'm sorry for the non-audience. A lot of customers came to see us today, and the supporters' cheers helped us during the last 5 minutes and 10 minutes. It's a difficult situation. Now it's a difficult situation no matter which one you comment on." Yoshida soon clarified his statement, saying it was his "personal idea". He helped Japan win all three matches in the group stage to advance to the knockout stage. In the quarter–final against New Zealand, Yoshida captained the whole game throughout 120 minutes with a goalless result and successfully converted the winning kick in the penalty shootout, as the Samurai Blue won 4–2 to reach the semi–finals. However, Japan lost the next two matches in the semi–finals and bronze medal match against Spain and Mexico respectively. Despite failing to win a medal as he hoped for, Yoshida reflected about being captain for Japan in the Olympics, saying: "I had a lot of fun. I thought I could give everyone something, but young players could absorb a lot of things. I think I was able to grow as a player. Let's be proud and go home. I want to be proud and go home. This is not the end. Still, my soccer life will continue."

Senior career

In December 2009, Yoshida was called up to the senior national team for the first time. He made his full international debut for Japan on 6 January 2010 in a 2011 AFC Asian Cup qualifier against Yemen. Yoshida later reflected on his debut, saying: "Of course Yemen war of 2010 (3-2) because it was all the way to the target, I was happy." After fracturing his fingers, Yoshida stated that he was determined to recovery from his injury and hope to get called up for the 2010 World Cup squad. However, Yoshida did not make the cut.

In December 2010, Yoshida was called up for the 2011 AFC Asian Cup in Qatar. Under the management of Alberto Zaccheroni, it's emerged that Yoshida is expecting to start in the centre–back position ahead of the tournament. He scored his first Japan goal, in a 1–1 draw against Jordan on 9 January 2011. Yoshida started two more matches in the group-stage, as Japan progressed through the knockout stage. However, Yoshida was sent–off for a second bookable offence, in a 3–2 win against Qatar in the quarter–finals of the AFC Asian Cup. After serving a one match suspension, Yoshida returned to the starting line-ups in the AFC Asian Cup Final against Australia and played 120 minutes, as they beat the Socceroos 1–0 to win the AFC Asian Cup, thanks to Tadanari Lee. Between 7 June 2011 and 2 September 2011, Yoshida kept three consecutive three cleans; including once against North Korea, which he scored the only goal of the game. Yoshida kept an additional three more clean sheets between 7 October 2011 and 11 November 2011.

Following the Olympics, Yoshida continued to help Japan by keeping three consecutive clean sheets between 6 September 2012 and 12 October 2012 against UAE, Iraq and France. He later helped Japan qualify for the World Cup after drawing 1–1 against Australia on 4 June 2013. Two days later, Yoshida was called up to the Samurai Blue for the 2013 Confederations Cup squad. He was featured three times in the tournament, as Japan loss all three matches and was eliminated in the Group Stage.

In May 2014, Yoshida was named in Japan's preliminary squad for the 2014 World Cup in Brazil. In the end, he made it to the final cut for the 23-man squad. Yoshida started all three matches despite facing competitions from the centre–back and subsequently, Japan was eliminated from the tournament in the group stage, without winning any matches. Despite this, he kept a clean sheet in a 0–0 draw against Greece on 20 June 2014. Later in 2014, Yoshida scored his first Japan's goal in three years, as they beat Honduras 6–0 on 14 November 2014.

In December 2014, Yoshida was selected as a member of the Japanese team for the 2015 AFC Asian Cup in Australia. He played Japan's opener match against debutant Palestine and scored the final goal in a 4–0 win. Yoshida helped Japan keep two more clean sheets to advance through to the quarter–finals. However, he conceded a goal from Ali Mabkhout before Japan equalised and the match was played throughout 120 minutes; ultimately, they were eliminated after losing in penalty–shootout. After the match, Yoshida acknowledged his fault for conceding a goal from the opposition team.

Throughout Japan's matches in the World Cup Qualifying Round, Yoshida then scored again in a 3–0 win against Cambodia on 3 September 2015. He later helped Japan keep two more clean sheets against Afghanistan and Syria. Yoshida kept four more clean sheets in the World Cup Qualifying Round between 12 November 2015 and 29 March 2016. During the run, he scored two goals against Singapore and Afghanistan. Three months later on 3 June 2016, Yoshida scored a brace, scoring in the fourth and five goal, in a 7–2 win against Bulgaria. The following March, he captained Japan for the first time in his career and helped the Samurai Blue beat United Arabs Emirates 2–0. After the match, Yoshida said: "I have played several times in my team, but it is a big thing to be the captain of the national team. I felt it." In a follow–up match against Thailand, he scored again, in a 4–0 win. Three months later, on 31 August 2017, Yoshida started the whole match against Australia and helped Japan qualify for the World Cup after beating the Socceroos 2–0.

On 31 May 2018, Yoshida was selected in the 23-man squad for the 2018 FIFA World Cup in Russia. It was expected once again that Yoshida will be starting in the centre–back position ahead of the tournament. He played every single minute in all the group stage matches against Colombia, Senegal and Poland. His side were knocked out of the tournament after losing 3–2 to Belgium in the round of 16 match. His performance in the World Cup earned praises from the British media, such as, The Guardian and BBC Sport.

In December 2018, Yoshida was one of 23 Japanese players selected for the 2019 AFC Asian Cup. Ahead of the tournament, he was given the captaincy once again. Yoshida started the tournament as captain well when he helped Japan win 3–2 against Turkmenistan. In a follow–up match against Oman, Yoshida led the side to keep a clean sheet, in a 1–0 win to advance to the knockout stage. He later helped Japan keep three clean sheets that led the Samurai Blue reaching the final for the first time since 2011. In the AFC Asian Cup final against Qatar, Yoshida started and captained the side, as they lost 3–1, finishing as runner–up in the process. During the match, he was penalised for handball, leading Qatar to successfully convert the penalty to give the opposition team a 3–1 lead. After the match, Yoshida said: "I felt that the team had a good performance in the (semi-final) match against Iran, and they felt that they were going to be able to go this way and be able to go this way. I couldn't control, and I didn't win. I feel unhappy." However, Yoshida's call-up to the tournament caused squad selection problems for new Southampton manager Ralph Hasenhüttl during his absence. In response, he acknowledged the risk he took by playing for Japan in the Asian Cup.

Following the conclusion of the AFC Asian Cup, Yoshida didn't receive an international call–up until August. He was also given the captaincy. Yoshida captained the remaining matches of 2019 with clean sheets. During this run, he scored his first international goal of the year, in a 6–0 win against Mongolia on 10 October 2019. On 14 November 2019, Yoshida also played his 100th match for Japan against Kyrgyzstan. Almost a year later, in October 2020, he was called up to the Samurai Blue squad. He started four matches as captain by the end of the year and helped Japan keep three consecutive clean sheets before losing to Mexico on 17 November 2020. At the beginning of 2021, Yoshida continued to retain his captaincy and helped the Samurai Blue kept another three consecutive clean sheets against South Korea, Mongolia and Myanmar.

Personal life
Yoshida has two brothers: Mirei and Honami He later credited his older brother, Honami, for playing an important role in his football career. Before he was born, his name "Maya" was originally planned for a girl when his mother was pregnant. But the name was kept even if it was a boy who was born. Yoshida revealed on his blog on 26 September 2012 that he was married. Four years later, Yoshida revealed he was a first time father when his wife gave birth to a baby daughter. During his time at Southampton, Yoshida resided in Winchester. After spending seven years at Southampton, Yoshida revealed in an interview with SunSport that he's a permanent resident in the United Kingdom and feels 25 per cent English.

His family runs a boarding house in Nagasaki for children who cannot go to high school. Growing up, Yoshida revealed he's a fan of Dragon Ball Z and had an entire collection until his Dad gave it to charity. Yoshida reflected on this, saying it helped him to think generously and give back to society. In November 2007, Yoshida signed for an agency with Tetsuro Kiyooka, a FIFA Players' Agent (Sports agent), in hopes of moving to Europe. It worked when he joined VVV-Venlo, three years later after signing for Tetsuro Kiyooka. Since moving to Europe, Yoshida created his personal blog, where he reflected about his experience living and playing in a different continent. On every anniversary of the Atomic bombings, Yoshida, who is from Nagasaki, spoke out about the thoughts of the event.

In May 2018, Yoshida published his first book titled "Unbeatable Mind". In addition to speaking Japanese, Yoshida is fluent in English since he first studied the language in middle school. Yoshida also studied Italian and Spanish. By August 2020, Yoshida began to speak Italian fluently.

On 9 August 2013, it was announced that Yoshida would be on the front cover of the Japanese Edition of FIFA 14. During his Japan's career, Yoshida said he considered Atsuto Uchida as fellow competitor, yet his best friend, and is also friends with Eiji Kawashima. Yoshida has an uncle, Tsuyoshi Shimoyanagi, who is a former professional baseball player. He is also a part-owner of Soccer Samurai. In August 2019, Yoshida revealed that he was pledging one percent of his salary to a pledge-based charitable movement, named Saints Foundation. Two months later, Yoshida was named ambassador for the Saints' Foundation along with teammate James Ward-Prowse.

In the wake of COVID-19 pandemic, Yoshida posted a message on his social media account, urging people to stay at home. While the season was suspended because of the COVID-19 pandemic, Yoshida said he exercised daily for three months in order to maintain his fitness. In May 2020, Yoshida used his own money to buy 10,000 masks from Japan and deliver them to hospitals in Genoa.

Career statistics

Club

International

Scores and results list Japan's goal tally first, score column indicates score after each Yoshida goal.

Honours
Southampton
EFL Cup runner-up: 2016–17

Japan
AFC Asian Cup: 2011; runner-up: 2019

Individual
 AFC Asian Cup Team of the Tournament: 2019
IFFHS AFC Man Team of the Year: 2020
IFFHS AFC Men's Team of the Decade 2011–2020

See also
 List of men's footballers with 100 or more international caps

References

External links

 Profile at the FC Schalke 04 website
 
 
 
 
 
 
  

1988 births
Living people
Association football people from Nagasaki Prefecture
Japanese footballers
Japan international footballers
J1 League players
Eredivisie players
Premier League players
Serie A players
Bundesliga players
Nagoya Grampus players
VVV-Venlo players
Southampton F.C. players
U.C. Sampdoria players
FC Schalke 04 players
Olympic footballers of Japan
Footballers at the 2008 Summer Olympics
Footballers at the 2012 Summer Olympics
2011 AFC Asian Cup players
AFC Asian Cup-winning players
2013 FIFA Confederations Cup players
2014 FIFA World Cup players
2015 AFC Asian Cup players
2018 FIFA World Cup players
2019 AFC Asian Cup players
Japanese expatriate footballers
Expatriate footballers in the Netherlands
Japanese expatriate sportspeople in the Netherlands
Expatriate footballers in England
Japanese expatriate sportspeople in England
Expatriate footballers in Italy
Japanese expatriate sportspeople in Italy
Expatriate footballers in Germany
Japanese expatriate sportspeople in Germany
Association football central defenders
FIFA Century Club
Footballers at the 2020 Summer Olympics
2022 FIFA World Cup players
Presidents of the Japan Pro-Footballers Association